The Oman national cricket team is the team that represents the country of Oman and is governed by Oman Cricket , which became an Affiliate Member of the International Cricket Council (ICC) in 2000, and gained Associate status in 2014. The national side has played matches at Twenty20 International level. On 24 April 2019, Oman achieved One-Day International status for the first time until 2023, after they beat tournament hosts Namibia by four wickets in 2019 ICC World Cricket League Division Two. 

Oman's first competitive matches came at the 2002 ACC Trophy, and the side has since participated in many Asian Cricket Council tournaments, finishing runner-up in the 2004 ACC Trophy and twice winning the ACC Twenty20 Cup. Oman has participated in ICC World Cup Qualifier without qualifying for the final tournament, placing ninth at the 2005 ICC Trophy and eleventh at the 2009 World Cup Qualifier. In July 2015, with their win against Namibia in the 2015 ICC World Twenty20 Qualifier, Oman gained Twenty20 International status and qualified for 2016 ICC World Twenty20 in India, its first major international tournament

In April 2018, the ICC decided to grant full Twenty20 International (T20I) status to all its members. Therefore, all Twenty20 matches played between Oman and other ICC Members after 1 January 2019 will be a full T20I.

Most cricket in Oman is played by expatriate Indians and Pakistanis (and their descendants), rather than by native Omanis – in 2010, only 100 of the 780 players in the national league were Arabs, or around 13 percent. The composition of the Omani national side has generally reflected this, although several Arabs have appeared for the team. Quotas of Arab players have been introduced for both club teams and the national side, in order to boost cricket's popularity amongst the Arab population.

Compared to other Associate nations, Oman have been incredibly consistent and the quickest team in terms of rise in performance. The team had been participating in Division 5, against small teams like Tanzania, Nigeria just in 2016. They had also only become an associate member in 2014. But in just 4 years they have become an established ODI nation, and one of the strongest associate teams in cricket. They have also established themselves in T20Is, won through all divisions and participated in a World T20. It is an incredible achievement of doing all these difficult things in such a small span of time.

History

Early years and ICC Membership

Oman became an affiliate member of the ICC in 2000. Their senior international debut came at the 2002 ACC Trophy where they failed to progress beyond the first round, with their only win coming against Qatar. A huge improvement was shown in the 2004 tournament when they reached the final, where they lost against the United Arab Emirates. This qualified them for the 2005 ICC Trophy, the final qualification stage for the 2007 World Cup. It also qualified them for the Asia Cup in 2006. Later in 2004, they won the Middle East Cup after a tied game against Bahrain. They won the tournament as they beat Bahrain in the group stage. In the 2014 ACC Premier League in Malaysia they reached 4th place with three wins.

2005 ICC Trophy and aftermath

In 2005, Oman became the first affiliate member of the ICC to compete in the ICC Trophy. Despite being the mystery men of the tournament, they lost all their group games, but then won their play-off games against Uganda and the USA, the latter when they successfully chased down a mammoth target of 345, featuring an unbroken 127-run partnership for the eighth wicket. This gave them ninth place out of the twelve teams in the competition, enough to earn a place in Division Two of the ICC World Cricket League in 2007.

2006 saw a drop in form for Oman, as they were eliminated in the first round of the ACC Trophy, with their only win coming against the Maldives. As mentioned above, they were originally scheduled to participate in the Asia Cup in 2006, playing their first ODIs against Pakistan and India. However, this tournament was postponed until 2008, and the ACC decided to use the 2006 ACC Trophy as a qualification tournament, meaning that Oman's place was taken by Hong Kong.

2007–2013

In October/November 2007, Oman took part in the inaugural ACC Twenty20 Cup held in Kuwait, where they played in Group A against; Afghanistan, Malaysia, Nepal and Qatar. Oman finished in the top two of their group and qualified for the semi-final stage. Oman beat Kuwait in their semi-final, then shared the tournament after the final match against Afghanistan was tied.

In November 2007, Oman travelled to Namibia to take part in Division Two of the ICC World Cricket League. They played Denmark, the hosts and the UAE in addition to the two qualifiers from Division Three; Uganda and Argentina. Although Oman won all their group matches, they lost to the UAE in the final. On the basis of their top four finish in this tournament, Oman qualified for the ICC World Cup Qualifier in 2009, the final tournament in qualification for the 2011 World Cup.

In January 2009, Oman participated in the ACC Cup, Challenge tournament in Chiang Mai, Thailand. They came first with ease, defeating the Maldives and Bhutan in the Semi finals and finals respectively. The fourth favourites to win the cup were hosts, Thailand who ended up in fourth place.

In April 2009, Oman travelled to South Africa to participate in the ICC World Cup Qualifier, the final tournament in qualification for the 2011 World Cup. During the tournament Oman finished last in their group and in the 11th place playoff they beat Denmark by 5 wickets.

In the 2009 ACC Twenty20 Cup, Oman were drawn in Group B. In the group stages of the competition it won all five of its games, finishing top of the group and qualifying for the semi-finals. In the semi-finals it lost to the United Arab Emirates, therefore missing out on a chance to win back-to-back titles. In the third place playoff, it defeated Kuwait. This victory enabled Oman to claim the final qualifying spot for the cricket tournament at the 2010 Asian Games. They played in 2011 ICC World Cricket League Division Three, where they came 3rd to remain in 2013 ICC World Cricket League Division Three.

2014 onwards: Associate Membership and ODI and T20I status 

At the ICC Annual Conference, held in Melbourne, Australia, in June 2014, the Oman Cricket Board was upgraded from an affiliate member of the ICC to an associate member. That announcement came during the 2014 WCL Division Four, where Oman placed fifth to be relegated to the 2016 Division Five event. Despite the team's poor performance in the 50-over format, Oman went on to win its next major international tournament, the 2015 ACC Twenty20 Cup, thus qualifying for 2015 World Twenty20 Qualifier in Ireland and Scotland.

By defeating Namibia in a sudden-death match at the World Twenty20 Qualifier, Oman reached the top six teams at the tournament, thus qualifying for the 2016 World Twenty20 and gaining Twenty20 International status until at least 2019. The team made its T20I debut in the fifth-place play-off against Afghanistan, and later in the year played bilateral T20I series against Afghanistan, Hong Kong, and United Arab Emirates. 

In 2016 Oman appeared at the 2016 World Twenty20 in India where they recorded an upset victory over Ireland.
 
They also appeared at the 2016 Asia Cup Qualifier.

In January 2017 Oman took part in the 2017 Desert T20 Challenge. They reached the semi-finals of the tournament by beating Hong Kong in the group stages, before being defeated by Afghanistan.

In April 2019, Oman gained ODI status for the first time, until at least 2022.

International grounds

Current squad
This lists all players who were in the most recent ODI or T20I squads. Uncapped players are listed in italics.
Updated as on 26 November 2022

Coaching staff

Tournament history

ICC Trophy/ICC Cricket World Cup Qualifier

1979 to 1997: Not eligible – not an ICC Member
2001: Not eligible – ICC Affiliate Member
2005: 9th place
2009: 11th place
2014: Did not qualify
2018: Did not qualify
2023: Qualified

ICC T20 World Cup

ICC T20 World Cup Qualifier 
 2008: Not eligible 
 2010: Not eligible
 2012: 15th place
 2014: Did not qualify
 2015: 6th place
 2019: 6th place
 2022: 4th place

ICC World Cricket League

 2007 Division Two: 2nd place
 2011 Division Three: 3rd place
 2013 Division Three: 5th place – relegated
 2014 Division Four: 5th place – relegated
 2016 Division Five: 2nd place - promoted
 2016 Division Four: 2nd place - promoted
 2017 Division Three: Champions - promoted
 2018 Division Two: 5th place - relegated
 2018 Division Three: Champions (hosts) - promoted
 2019 Division Two: 2nd place

ACC Trophy

1996 to 2000: Not eligible – not an ACC member
2002: Group stage 
2004: 2nd place 
2006: 11th place 
2009 Challenge: Champions – promoted
2010 Elite: 6th place 
2012 Elite: 6th place
2014 Premier: 4th place
2014 Championship: Qualified – tournament not held

ACC Twenty20 Cup

2007: 1st place – tied with Afghanistan
2009: 3rd place 
2011: 3rd place 
2013: Group stage 
2015: 1st place

Asia Cup Qualifier 
2018: 3rd place
2020: Did not qualify

ACC Western Region T20

2019: Did not participate 
2020: Group League (5th)

Asian Games
2010: Qualified – did not participate
2014: Did not participate

Desert T20 Challenge
2017: 4th place

Records and statistics 

International match summary — Oman
 
Last updated 21 November 2022

One-Day Internationals 

 Highest team total: 307/9 v. UAE on 5 February 2022 at Oman Cricket Academy Ground Turf 1, Muscat.
 Highest individual score: 118*, Jatinder Singh v. Papua New Guinea on 12 April 2022 at Dubai International Cricket Stadium, Dubai.
 Best bowling figures in an innings: 5/15, Khawar Ali v. Papua New Guinea on 1 October 2021 at Oman Cricket Academy Ground Turf 1, Muscat.

Most ODI runs for Oman

Most ODI wickets for Oman

ODI record versus other nations

Records complete to ODI #4410. Last updated 14 June 2022.

Twenty20 Internationals 

 Highest team total: 220/5 v. Bahrain on 19 November 2022 at Oman Cricket Academy Ground Turf 1, Muscat.
 Highest individual score: 102*, Zeeshan Maqsood v. Bahrain on 19 November 2022 at Oman Cricket Academy Ground Turf 1, Muscat.
 Best bowling figures in an innings: 5/15, Aamir Kaleem v. Nepal on 10 October 2019 at Oman Cricket Academy Ground Turf 1, Muscat.

Most T20I runs for Oman

Most T20I wickets for Oman

T20I record versus other nations

Records complete to T20I #1910. Last updated 21 November 2022.

See also
 Cricket in Oman
 List of Oman ODI cricketers
 List of Oman Twenty20 International cricketers

Notes

References

National cricket teams
Cricket
Oman in international cricket
Cricket in Oman